In physics and in electronic engineering, dark current is the relatively small electric current that flows through photosensitive devices such as a photomultiplier tube, photodiode, or charge-coupled device even when no photons enter the device; it consists of the charges generated in the detector when no outside radiation is entering the detector. It is referred to as reverse bias leakage current in non-optical devices and is present in all diodes. Physically, dark current is due to the random generation of electrons and holes within the depletion region of the device.

The charge generation rate is related to specific crystallographic defects within the depletion region. Dark-current spectroscopy can be used to determine the defects present by monitoring the peaks in the dark current histogram's evolution with temperature.

Dark current is one of the main sources for noise in image sensors such as charge-coupled devices. The pattern of different dark currents can result in a fixed-pattern noise; dark frame subtraction can remove an estimate of the mean fixed pattern, but there still remains a temporal noise, because the dark current itself has a shot noise.
This dark current is the same that is studied in PN-Junction studies.

References

Electronic engineering
Optoelectronics